Rafał Szwed  (born 18 July 1973 in Sokołów Podlaski) is a retired Polish professional footballer who last played for Start Otwock in the Polish Second League.

Szwed has made one appearance for the Poland national football team.

References

External links
 

1973 births
Living people
Polish footballers
Poland international footballers
OKS Stomil Olsztyn players
Ruch Chorzów players
Mławianka Mława players
Górnik Zabrze players
Polonia Warsaw players
Widzew Łódź players
Radomiak Radom players
People from Sokołów County
Sportspeople from Masovian Voivodeship
Association football midfielders